”The Great Silence” is a science fiction novelette by American writer Ted Chiang, initially published in e-flux Journal in May 2015. The story also appeared in the  2016 anthology The Best American Short Stories and in the 2019 collection Exhalation: Stories.

Plot summary
There is the grandiose Arecibo radio telescope in Puerto Rico. In 1974, a radio message from humanity was sent into deep space, a cry into the void among the stars in the hope of contact with extraterrestrial intelligent beings. But what if they already live very close to the telescope?

"...imagines a parrot talking to the humans managing the Arecibo Observatory in Puerto Rico, for more than 50 years the largest single dish radio telescope on earth. There we are, creating technological marvels to find life in the stars, while we heedlessly drive wild parrots, among so many others species, toward extinction here at home.

'We’re a nonhuman species capable of communicating with them,” the parrot muses. “Aren’t we exactly what humans are looking for?' "

See also
Fermi Paradox, a seemingly paradoxical absence of evidence for extraterrestrial intelligence.
Irene Pepperberg, the animal cognition scientist whose work with the parrot, Alex, is reference in the story.

References

External links 
 
 The Great Silence in Nautilus, August 15, 2019.

Science fiction short stories
2015 short stories
Short stories by Ted Chiang
Arecibo, Puerto Rico
Puerto Rico in fiction
Fictional parrots
Talking animals in fiction